The 1984 Angus District Council election took place on the 1 May 1984 to elect members of Angus District Council, as part of that years Scottish local elections. They were fought on revised boundaries, with 21 seats down from 22.

Election results

References

1984 Scottish local elections
1984
May 1984 events in the United Kingdom